Mana and Mani is an opera for children written by Hossein Dehlavi in 1979 as his contribution to the Year of the Child (1979) and UNICEF's request. The opera was written in 20 sections and 520 pages, but it wasn't performed at that time because of the Iranian Revolution. 

Mana and Mani was first performed by Ali Rahbari and Bratislava Philharmonic Orchestra. This performance didn't include the choral sections. In 2012 the opera was performed in Iran more completely by 250 people led by Alireza Shafaghi Nejad and directed by Mohammad Aghebati and cooperating Naser Nazar and Pars music group.

References 

Persian-language operas
1979 operas
Children's operas
Operas